Bulgaria is a nation that has appeared at Hopman Cup on one occasion, in 2012.

Players
This is a list of players who have played for Bulgaria in the Hopman Cup.

Results

References

Hopman Cup teams
Tennis in Bulgaria
National sports teams of Bulgaria